The Reformed Church is a church in Lompirt, Romania, completed in 1777.

Gallery

Bibliography
 Szilágylompért, szerkesztő Szőnyi Levente, 2009, Color Print Nyomda, Zilah,

References

External links
 Lompirt, Reformed church
 Biserica Reformată
  A Szilágylompérti Református Egyházközség oldala a parokia.net-en 
  ADY ENDRE ÉS SZILÁGYLOMPÉRT

Reformed churches in Romania
Churches completed in 1777
Churches in Sălaj County